Gayles may refer to:

Places
 Gayles, North Yorkshire, a village in England
 Gayles, Virginia, an unincorporated community in King George County, Virginia, United States

People
 Billy Gayles (born 1931), American rhythm & blues drummer and vocalist
 Caesar Felton Gayles (born 1900), American football and basketball coach
 Darrin P. Gayles (born 1966), American judge
 Fred Gayles (born 1966), American former arena football wide receiver/linebacker in the Arena Football League
 George W. Gayles (born 1844), African-American Baptist minister and politician holding offices in Mississippi
 Joseph Gayles (born 1844), American criminal, one of the leaders of the Patsy Conroy Gang in New York City

See also
 Gayle (disambiguation)
 Gaylesville, Alabama